Saniya Shamshad is a Pakistan actress and model. She is known for her roles in dramas Piyari Bittu, Hiddat, Piya Naam Ka Diya, Rishtay Biktay Hain, Aseerzadi, Main Haar Nahi Manoun Gi, Sadqay Tumhare and Siyani.

Early life 
Saniya was born in 1990 on October 5 in Lahore, Pakistan. She completed her primary schooling from Stigma Foundation and then she completed her studies from Punjab College.

Career 
She studied political science and sociology, during her studies Waseem Abbas noticed her potential in acting and cast her, then she made her acting debut in 2011 in drama Tere Pehlu Main opposite Affan Waheed. She appeared in dramas Aseerzadi, Mere Huzoor, Maya, Chhoti Chhoti Khushiyaan, Mein Adhuri, Mera Saaein 2, Bus Yunhi, and Ghaao. Then she also appeared in dramas Zinda Dargor, Rashk, Agar Tum Na Hotay, Piyari Bittu, Daraar, Main Deewani and Sadqay Tumhare. Since then she appeared in dramas Piya Naam Ka Diya, Lagaao, Dastaar-e-Anaa, Rehaai, Main Haar Nahi Manoun Gi, Khidmat Guzar, Hiddat and Siyani.

Personal life 
Saniya married Hidayat Syed in July 2019 and moved to Australia and they have one child together a son.

Filmography

Television

Film

Awards and nominations

References

External links 
 

1990 births
Pakistani television actresses
Living people
21st-century Pakistani actresses
Pakistani film actresses